Lain may refer to:

Places
Lain, Guinea, a town and sub-prefecture in the Nzérékoré Region
Lain, Iran, a village in Kurdistan Province
Lain, Yonne, a commune in the Yonne département, France

People
Douglas Lain (born 1970), American science fiction writer
Saint Latuinus, also known as Saint Lain, bishop of Sées

Other uses
Laining, a synonym for Torah reading
Serial Experiments Lain, an anime television series
Lain Iwakura, the title character of Serial Experiments Lain